Rodrigo Afonso (fl. late 15th century) was a Portuguese colonial administrator.

Biography
His early life is unknown. He was probably born on Ribeira Grande (now Cidade Velha) and was the first colonial governor who was born in Cape Verde.  He was probably was one of the first Portuguese people born in Cape Verde.  He was likely a son of the explorer Diogo Afonso.

He was later the 2nd and last captain of Northern Santiago. He was donated the island of Boa Vista in 1490 and became captain on from October 29, 1497, until 1505 and three days later for Boa Vista Island.  The main administration of Southern Santiago would be ruled only by the corregedor of Cape Verde, from 1588 to 1975 as governor.

See also
List of colonial governors of Cape Verde, including its predecessor the Captains of Northern Santiago and Boa Vista

References

Portuguese colonial governors and administrators
Portuguese explorers
15th-century Portuguese people